Gehamat Shibasaki (born 18 February 1998) is an Australian-Japanese professional rugby league footballer who plays as a  or er for the North Queensland Cowboys in the National Rugby League.

He previously played for the Brisbane Broncos and Newcastle Knights in the National Rugby League and Green Rockets Tokatsu in the Japan Rugby League One.

Background
Shibasaki was born in Townsville, Queensland, Australia, and is of Torres Strait Islander, Japanese and Palau descent. 

He played his junior rugby league for Townsville Brothers before being signed by the Brisbane Broncos.

Playing career

Early career
Shibasaki played for the Brisbane Broncos NYC team in 2016-2017. On 13 July 2016, Shibasaki played for the Queensland under 20's team against New South Wales, playing at centre in the 36-22 loss at ANZ Stadium. In February 2017, Shibasaki was selected in Brisbane's 2017 NRL Auckland Nines squad. On 31 May 2017, Shibasaki was selected to play at centre again for Queensland in the Under 20's State of Origin clash in the 30-16 loss at Suncorp Stadium.

2018
In 2018, Shibasaki moved from the Under 20's team to the Queensland Cup, playing for the Norths Devils. In Round 11 against the Sydney Roosters, Shibasaki was named to make his NRL debut but was only to be replaced later in the week by Kotoni Staggs. On 11 July 2018, Shibasaki was selected for the third year in a row for Queensland Under 20's at centre as they won their first title in a 30-12 victory at Suncorp Stadium. In Round 22 of the 2018 NRL season, Shibasaki made his NRL debut for the Brisbane Broncos against the North Queensland Cowboys in his home town in Townsville, playing at centre for the axed Jordan Kahu in Brisbane's heartbreaking 34-30 loss at 1300SMILES Stadium. A day after making his debut, Shibasaki was rewarded with a contract extension with the Brisbane Broncos to the end of the 2020 NRL season.

2019
Shibasaki made 12 appearances for Brisbane in the 2019 NRL season as the club finished 8th on the table and qualified for the finals. Shibasaki played in the club's elimination final against Parramatta which Brisbane lost 58-0 at the new Western Sydney Stadium. The defeat was the worst in Brisbane's history and also the biggest finals defeat in history. In December, he gained a release from Brisbane to join the Newcastle Knights effective immediately on a three-year contract.

2020
Shibasaki played 11 games for Newcastle in the 2020 NRL season. Shibasaki did not play in Newcastle's finals campaign where they were eliminated in the opening week against South Sydney.

2021
Shibasaki played 3 games for the Knights in 2021 before being released at the end of the season.

2022
On 17 July, Shibasaki signed with the North Queensland Cowboys on a train and trial contract for the remainder of the 2022 NRL season. On 15 November, he signed a one-year contract with the club for 2023.

References

External links
Newcastle Knights profile

1998 births
Living people
Australian people of Japanese descent
Australian people of Malaysian descent
Australian rugby league players
Australian rugby union players
Brisbane Broncos players
Green Rockets Tokatsu players
Indigenous Australian rugby league players
Newcastle Knights players
North Queensland Cowboys players
Norths Devils players
Rugby league centres
Rugby league players from Townsville
Rugby union centres
Rugby union wings
Torres Strait Islanders